Andreas Eigner (1801–1870), who was born at Diedldorf, Upper Palatinate, distinguished himself as a painter and a restorer of old pictures. He successfully employed alcoholic vapours, and a varnish of his own invention, to protect paintings against the destructive influence of the atmosphere. He was chiefly employed in the galleries of Munich, Augsburg, Stuttgart, Carlsruhe, Basle, and Solothurn. He died at Augsburg in 1870.

See also
 List of German painters

References
 

1801 births
1870 deaths
19th-century German painters
German male painters
People from Schwandorf (district)
Conservator-restorers
19th-century German male artists